is a Japanese international rugby union player who plays as a flanker.   He currently plays for the Toshiba Brave Lupus in Japan's domestic Top League.

Club career

Yamamoto has played all of his senior club rugby in Japan with the Toshiba Brave Lupus who he joined in 2015.

International

Yatabe made his senior international debut in a match against South Korea on April 30, 2016 and featured in 3 more tests against Asian opposition in the spring of 2016 before making a substitute appearance against  in Toyota during the 2016 mid-year rugby union internationals series.

References

1992 births
Living people
Japanese rugby union players
Japan international rugby union players
Rugby union flankers
Toshiba Brave Lupus Tokyo players
People from Osaka Prefecture
University of Tsukuba alumni